The General's Wife is a horror short story by Peter Straub.  It was first published in 1982 by Donald M. Grant, Publisher, Inc. in an edition of 1,200 copies and was issued without a jacket.  The story is from a previously unpublished extract from the manuscript of Straub's novel, Floating Dragon.

References

1982 books
1982 short stories
American novellas
Donald M. Grant, Publisher books
Horror short stories